Jacob Moleschott (9 August 1822 – 20 May 1893) was a Dutch physiologist and writer on dietetics. He is known for his philosophical views in regard to scientific materialism. He was a member of German Academy of Sciences Leopoldina (since 1884).

Life
Born in 's-Hertogenbosch, Netherlands,  Moleschott studied at Heidelberg University, where he obtained his PhD in 1845, and began the practice of medicine in Utrecht in 1845, but soon moved back to Heidelberg University, where he lectured on physiology starting in 1847. The university reprimanded Moleschott for various controversial statements made in his lectures, leading to his resignation in 1854. Next to Carl Vogt and Ludwig Büchner, Moleschott stood in the center of the public debates about materialism in Germany in the 1850s.

He taught as a professor of physiology at Zürich (1856), at Turin (1861), and at Rome (1879), where he died.

Writings 
Moleschott explained the origin and condition of animals by the working of physical causes. He was an atheist. His characteristic formulae were "no thought without phosphorus" and "the brain secretes thought as the liver secretes bile." His major works are: 

 Lehre der Nahrungsmittel. Für das Volk (Erlangen, 1850; 3rd edition, Erlangen, 1858)  
 Physiologie der Nahrungsmittel (1850; second edition, 1859)  
 Physiologie des Stoffwechsels in Pflanzen und Thieren (1851)  
 Der Kreislauf des Lebens (1852; fifth edition, 1887)  
 Untersuchungen zur Naturlehre des Menschen und der tiere (1856–93), continued after his death by Colosanti and Fubini  
 Sulla vita umana (1861–67), a collection of essays   
 Physiologisches Skizzenbuch (1861)  
 Consigli e conforti nei tempi di colera (1864; third edition, 1884)  
 Sull' influenza della luce mista e cromatica nell' esalazione di acido carbonico per l'organismo animale (1879), with Fubini
 Kleine Schriften (1880–87), collected essays and addresses   
 Für meine Freunde (1894)

The Jacob Moleschoot fund is kept in the Archiginnasio of Bologna's public library .

Notes

References
 Andreas Daum, Wissenschaftspopularisierung im 19. Jahrhundert: Bürgerliche Kultur, naturwissenschaftliche Bildung und die deutsche Öffentlichkeit, 1848–1914. Munich: Oldenbourg, 1998, 2nd. edition 2002, including a short biography of Moleschott.
Fredrick Gregory: Scientific Materialism in Nineteenth Century Germany, Springer, 1977,

External links

 Short biography and bibliography in the Virtual Laboratory of the Max Planck Institute for the History of Science
 The Popular Science Monthly, Volume 49 Sketch of Jacob Moleschott

1822 births
1893 deaths
Dutch academics
Dutch atheists
Dutch physiologists
Materialists
People from 's-Hertogenbosch